During the 2005–06 season, Portsmouth competed in the FA Premier League. It was Portsmouth's third consecutive season in English football's top-flight.

Season summary
Manager Alain Perrin was sacked in November with Portsmouth struggling in the relegation zone. Joe Jordan was appointed caretaker manager after the sacking of Perrin.  He was replaced by Harry Redknapp, who had walked out of arch-rivals Southampton after being refused permission by the club to talk to Portsmouth about the managerial vacancy. For a while it looked as if Redknapp's efforts were in vain, with Portsmouth eight points adrift of safety at the end of February. However, by the end of March that had been cut to just three (with a game in hand over seventeenth-placed West Bromwich Albion) and eventually Portsmouth managed to secure survival with a 2–1 win at Wigan Athletic to send West Brom and Birmingham City down.

Kit
Portsmouth signed a deal with Jako to produce the club's kit. Oki became the kit sponsors. The strip was manufactured by Pompey Sport, but after the kit deal with Jako, they were rebadged with its logo. The home shirt was atypical for Portsmouth, as it had a large white space under the collar on the rear where players' names were printed. The away was red and gold, whilst the third was white and navy. The white strip was only worn three times, away at Manchester United, Aston Villa and West Ham United respectively.

Final league table

Results
Portsmouth's score comes first

Legend

FA Premier League

Results summary

Results per matchday

FA Cup

League Cup

First-team squad

Left club during season

Reserve squad

Statistics

Starting 11
Considering starts in all competitions
 GK: #15,  Jamie Ashdown, 18
 RB: #2,  Linvoy Primus, 21
 CB: #5,  Andy O'Brien, 32
 CB: #3,  Dejan Stefanović, 30
 LB: #6,  Brian Priske, 28
 RM: #26,  Gary O'Neil, 39
 CM: #22,  Richard Hughes, 24
 CM: #28,  Sean Davis, 17
 LM: #14,  Matthew Taylor, 35
 CF: #25,  Benjani Mwaruwari, 16
 CF: #32, Lomana LuaLua, 25

Transfers

In
  Andy O'Brien -  Newcastle United, £2,000,000, 13 June
  Laurent Robert -  Newcastle United, undisclosed, 19 June
  Jhon Viáfara -  Once Caldas, £1,600,000, 7 July
  Grégory Vignal -  Liverpool, free, 12 July
  Collins Mbesuma -  Kaizer Chiefs, undisclosed, 12 July
  Sander Westerveld -  Real Sociedad, free, 22 July
  Azar Karadas -  Benfica, loan, 22 July
  Brian Priske -  Genk, undisclosed, 22 August
  Zvonimir Vukić -  Shakhtar Donetsk, undisclosed, 29 August
  Darío Silva -  Sevilla FC, free, 31 August
  Franck Songo'o -  Barcelona, £205,000, 31 August
  Salif Diao -  Liverpool, season loan, 31 August
  Emmanuel Olisadebe -  Panathinaikos, undisclosed, 4 January
  Benjani Mwaruwari -  Auxerre, £4,100,000, 5 January
  Noé Pamarot,  Pedro Mendes,  Sean Davis -   Tottenham Hotspur, £7,500,000 combined, 12 January
  Dean Kiely -  Charlton Athletic, undisclosed, 25 January
  Wayne Routledge -  Tottenham Hotspur, season loan, 30 January
  Ognjen Koroman -  Terek Grozny, loan, 30 January
  Andrés D'Alessandro -  VfL Wolfsburg, season loan, 31 January

Out
 Patrik Berger -  Aston Villa, free, 17 May
 Yakubu -  Middlesbrough, £7,500,000, 23 May
 Richard Duffy -  Coventry City, season loan, 7 June
  Rowan Vine -  Luton Town, £250,000, 4 July
  Steve Stone -  Leeds United, free, 29 June
  Diomansy Kamara -  West Bromwich Albion, £1,500,000, 26 July 
  Ricardo Fuller -  Southampton, £90,000 (rising to £340,000 if Southampton gain promotion), 28 July
  Shaka Hislop -  West Ham United, free, 29 July
  Arjan de Zeeuw -  Wigan Athletic, £90,000, 11 August
  David Unsworth -  Sheffield United, free, 22 August
  Kostas Chalkias - released (later joined  Real Murcia), 19 January
  Darío Silva - released, 13 February
  Sander Westerveld -  Everton, 28-day loan, 24 February
  Jhon Viáfara -  Real Sociedad, loan, January
  James Keene -  GAIS, loan, March
  Hayden Foxe - released
  Aleksander Rodić -  Kayserispor, loan
  Giannis Skopelitis -  Egaleo, loan
  Gary Silk -  Boston United
Transfers in:  £16,250,000
Transfers out:  £9,450,000
Total spending:  £6,800,000

Notes

References

Portsmouth F.C. seasons
Portsmouth